James W. Cockburn,  (February 13, 1819 – August 14, 1883) was a Canadian Conservative politician, and a father of Canadian Confederation.

Early life
He was born in Berwick-Upon-Tweed on the English–Scottish border and immigrated to Canada with his father, James Cockburn Snr. (1787–1832), mother, Sarah Turnbull (1797–1866) and brother, Adam (1820–1860), at the age of 13. After attending Upper Canada College and Osgoode Hall, he established a law practice in Cobourg, Ontario.

Career
In the 1850s, Cockburn was elected to the town council. In 1861, he was elected to the Province of Canada's legislative assembly as a Reformer representing Northumberland West. Despite  elected as an opponent of the Macdonald - Cartier administration, Cockburn switched allegiances and became a supporter of Macdonald's Liberal-Conservative Party.

Cockburn attended the Quebec Conference of 1864 as a supporter of Confederation. After Confederation, he was elected to the new House of Commons of Canada in the country's first election. He was nominated by Sir John A. Macdonald to be Canada's first Speaker of the House of Commons, a position in which he served from 1867 to 1874.

His performance as Speaker was hindered by the fact that he spoke no French in a chamber in which both English and French were official languages. He did however understand French. In 1872, Cockburn was nominated for a second term as Speaker despite reservations by the Opposition that he had been too favourable to the government in his rulings. Cockburn lost his seat in the 1874 election that had been precipitated by the Pacific Scandal and that brought down the Macdonald government.

Cockburn won back his former seat in the 1878 election but did not take an active role in Parliament. He resigned in 1881 when he was appointed to collect and classify Canadian statutes but this assignment was cut short by his death.

Death

Cockburn died on August 14, 1883, from unknown causes. He is buried in St. James Cemetery, in Toronto.

Personal life
He married Isabella Susan Patterson in 1854 and they had three children: Sarah Isabella Cockburn, Francis Cockburn and May Cockburn.

References 

 
 

1819 births
1883 deaths
People from Berwick-upon-Tweed
People from Cobourg
Canadian lawyers
Canadian King's Counsel
James
Conservative Party of Canada (1867–1942) MPs
English emigrants to pre-Confederation Ontario
Fathers of Confederation
Members of the House of Commons of Canada from Ontario
Persons of National Historic Significance (Canada)
Speakers of the House of Commons of Canada
Upper Canada College alumni
Immigrants to Upper Canada
Burials at St. James Cemetery, Toronto
Members of the Legislative Assembly of the Province of Canada from Canada West